Bring Me Home may refer to:

 Bring Me Home (film), a 2019 South Korean film
 Bring Me Home: Live 2011, a 2012 video by British band Sade
 "Bring Me Home", a song from the 2019 album About Us by Australian singer G Flip